Gelugor is a southern suburb of George Town in Penang, Malaysia.

Gelugor had been populated as early as the late 18th century by Malay fishermen who arrived from Sumatra. The area was then cleared for agricultural plantations by David Brown, a partner of Captain Francis Light.

Urbanisation of the area began in earnest in the 1960s, when residential estates were established within the area. Gelugor gradually turned into a suburb of George Town, helped by its strategic location right in the middle between George Town proper and Bayan Lepas to the south. In 1969, Universiti Sains Malaysia was founded at Gelugor and is now one of the top Malaysian public universities.

In recent decades, Gelugor has assumed increased importance. In addition to hosting Penang Island's first university, the Penang Bridge, completed in 1985, was Penang's first cross-strait bridge, linking Gelugor with the Malay Peninsula.

Etymology 
Gelugor was named after Garcinia atroviridis, known in Malay as asam gelugor. Widely endemic in the Malay Peninsula, this species is especially cultivated on Penang Island for its medicinal properties.

History 
Gelugor was one of the first areas of Penang Island to be inhabited. Fishermen had moved into the area from Sumatra in the 18th century, predating Captain Francis Light's founding of Penang Island in 1786. They settled around the mouth of the Gelugor River (Malay: Sungai Gelugor) and Bukit Gelugor.

Soon after Light came ashore in what is now George Town in 1786, his Scottish partner, David Brown, cleared the jungles around Gelugor to make way for agricultural purposes, including spice and coconut plantations. Brown also brought in labourers from India to work in the estates. He eventually became the largest landowner on Penang Island in the early 19th century.

Up until the end of World War II, Gelugor remained a rural area. Prior to the war, the British Army converted one of David Brown's houses into the Glugor Barracks, to be renamed later as Minden Barracks. The army camp was occupied by the Imperial Japanese Army during the war. It was again put in use during the Malayan Emergency and the Indonesian Confrontation, before being closed for good in 1971 following the withdrawal of all British armed forces from Southeast Asia.

The development of residential estates at Gelugor began in the 1960s, originally to house civil servants. Also in the 1960s, a proposal to establish Penang's first university was mooted. Eventually, the Penang University was founded in 1969, before being relocated to the former Minden Barracks in 1971. The university has since been renamed Universiti Sains Malaysia, now one of the foremost public universities in Malaysia.

In 1985, the Penang Bridge that connects Gelugor with the Malay Peninsula was completed. The bridge has indirectly boosted urbanisation at Gelugor, which also lies right between George Town proper and the Bayan Lepas Free Industrial Zone.

Transportation 

Gelugor is directly linked to Seberang Perai, the mainland halve of Penang, via the -long Penang Bridge. Upon its completion in 1985, the bridge was the longest in Southeast Asia; that title has since been passed on to the Second Penang Bridge further south. Nonetheless, the Penang Bridge remains a heavily used road link between Penang Island and the mainland, due to the higher toll charges on the longer Second Penang Bridge, and the older bridge's closer proximity to both George Town and Butterworth.

Within the suburb, Jalan Sultan Azlan Shah serves as the main thoroughfare. In recent years, much of the pan-island and incoming traffic from the Penang Bridge have been diverted to the Tun Dr Lim Chong Eu Expressway, which runs along Gelugor's coastline as well.

Rapid Penang buses 11, 13, 102, 206, 301, 302, 303, 304, 401 and AT (Airport Transit) serve the residents of the suburb, by connecting Gelugor with George Town to the north and other destinations on Penang Island, such as the Penang International Airport, Batu Lanchang, Air Itam, Tanjung Bungah and Balik Pulau.

In addition, a cycling lane has been installed along the Tun Dr Lim Chong Eu Expressway as part of the move to encourage cycling as a form of alternative transportation. This -long cycling lane extends from George Town proper towards Queensbay Mall, south of the Penang Bridge.

Education 
A total of three primary schools and two high schools are located within Gelugor. These national schools are listed as follows.

Primary schools
 SRK Sungai Gelugor
 SRK Bukit Gelugor
 SRK Minden Height
High schools
 SMK Bukit Gambir
 SMK Datuk Hj. Mohamed Nor Ahmad
Gelugor is home to one of the top Malaysian public universities, Universiti Sains Malaysia (USM). It was ranked fifth within Malaysia by the QS World University Rankings . USM is also the only university in Malaysia to be accorded the APEX University status by the Malaysian federal government and one of the handful autonomous universities nationwide.

In addition, a teachers' training institution run by the Malaysian federal government, Institut Pendidikan Guru Pulau Pinang, is situated within Gelugor as well.

Shopping 
The sole shopping mall within Gelugor is Udini Square, which was opened in 2015. The mall, anchored by two sporting good chains, specialises in household hardware and sporting equipment. Udini Square is also complemented by a Lotus's store located opposite the mall; the two adjacent shopping complexes are connected via an overhead pedestrian bridge.

Another commercial complex, named e-Gate, is situated next to both Udini Square and the Tesco outlet, facing the Tun Dr Lim Chong Eu Expressway. This complex houses a number of high-end eateries and electronics stores, such as Subway and OldTown White Coffee.

Infrastructure 

Tenaga Nasional, Malaysia's main electric utility firm, operates a power plant at the coast of Gelugor. Running primarily on oil, the Gelugor Power Station generates 398MW of electricity.

The newly created Light neighbourhood at the coast of Gelugor contains a linear park equipped with a cycling track. Individual marinas have also been built within this seafront residential neighbourhood.

Future developments at Gelugor include the construction of a mixed-commercial and residential waterfront precinct, named The Light City. This project, a joint venture by Malaysia's IJM Land Berhad and Singapore's Perennial Real Estate Holdings, comprises a shopping mall and what will be Penang's largest convention centre, as well as luxury hotels and residential units.

Neighbourhoods 
 Minden Heights
 Taman Tun Sardon
 Bukit Gambir
 The Light

References 

Populated places in Penang
George Town, Penang